Nrusinhawadi commonly known as Narsobawadi or Narsobachi Wadi is a small town in Shirol Tahasil in Kolhapur district, Maharashtra. Narsobawadi gets its name from the presence of 'Shri Nrusinha Saraswati', the Purna Avatar of Lord Dattatreya.

With much archaeological value, this became a major pilgrim spot for many Shri Dattatreya devotees. Also, there is a confluence of the two rivers Panchganga and Krishna.

About 
Nrusinhawadi is famous for the Hindu temple of Shri Nrusinha Saraswati (1378–1458) located on the banks of the river Krushna.

Shri Dattatreya in his Nrusinha Saraswati incarnation is believed to have lived here for as long as 12 years. (Ref. Shri Gurucharitra). The life story of Shri Nrusinha Saraswati, his philosophy and related stories are described in Shri Guru Charitra. There are no images or idols here which show his presence. But there are two padukas or slippers which immortalize his great avatar.

Temple's Daily Schedule:
05.00 Kakad Aarti and Paduka Puja
08.00 to 12.00 Rudrabhishek
12.30 to 13.30 Maha Puja, Aarti
15.00 to 16.00 Pavamana Sookta Parayan
19.30 Dhoop Aarti
20.00 Palkhi
22.00 Shej Aarti
(after the Shej Aarti the temple is closed for devotees)

Vasudevanand Saraswati Maharaj, also known as Tembe Swami, a saint of recent times who is regarded as an incarnation of Dattatreya stayed here for 12 years. The room where Maharaj stayed is near the famous Datta temple which has the padukas of Dattatreya.

Festivals celebrated in Temple
 Datta Jayanti
 Narasimha Jayanti is celebrated in the Hindu calendar Pushya month
 Gopal Kala Utsav is celebrated from Magha Poornima to Phalguna Panchami.
 Sripada Srivallabha Jayanthi is celebrated in Badrapada Masa on Ganesha Chaturthi Day
 Dakshin dwar Sohla in which Krishna river water flows from North gate to South gate through temple

Location and transportation 
Narasimhawadi is a small town located at the banks of Krishna river . It is about 3 km from Shirol Taluka. Kurundawad is the nearest town and is about 2 km away. Medical City, Miraj is at a distance of 19 km. State transport bus depot is located close to the temple premises.
Narasimhawadi may be reached by state transport buses that available from Jaysingpur and Kolhapur.
Nearest railway station is Jaysingpur which is about 17 km from this place.
There are state transport buses connecting nearby cities. There are share jeeps and private vehicles available too.
The typical distances from major cities in Maharashtra are:
Pune – Narsoba Wadi (254 km), Sangli – Narsoba Wadi (22 km), Miraj – Narsoba Wadi (19 km), Jaysingpur – Narsoba Wadi (16.7 km), Kolhapur – Narsoba Wadi (52 km), Audumbar – Narsoba Wadi (53 km), Nipanni – Narsoba Wadi (45 km), Mumbai – Narsoba Wadi (405 km via Mumbai Bangalore Express Highway). (Ref. Google Maps)

Railways 
Central Railway's Sangli railway station and Miraj Junction railway station are the closest Railway stations which is connected to almost all parts of India.

Many Devotees from North Karnataka prefer Miraj Junction to visit Narsobawadi. Further Jaysingpur station is smaller, but closest to the destination. Jaysingpur falls in between the cities of Miraj and Kolhapur.

Amenities
The town is known for its  Basundi and Kandi pedhe. kavathachi barfi is another local delicacy. There are many small food stalls around temple premises serving hot local preparations like amboli, kat-wada, mirchi bhajiyas and fresh sugarcane juice. Lodgings is available at local brahmin houses at  reasonable rate. The hosts also serve simple homemade Brahmin meals.

References

External links 
Shri Guru Charitra texts
 http://wikimapia.org/126733/Narsinha-Wadi-Narasoba-Wadi-or-Narsoba-Wadi-or-Narasimhapur-or-Nrusimha-Wadi
 http://www.amazingmaharashtra.com/2012/10/narsobachi-wadi.html
 https://www.google.co.in/maps

Tourist attractions in Kolhapur district
Hindu pilgrimage sites in India